A Gauntlet for the Gold match is a professional wrestling match used in Impact Wrestling.

Match format 
Different from the other gauntlet matches, in which one competitor faces several others in turn, the Gauntlet for the Gold match is very similar to the fellow professional wrestling promotion WWE's Royal Rumble match. It consists of two competitors beginning the match in the ring, followed by competitors entering the ring at timed intervals. Elimination is in the standard battle royal format in which a competitor must go over the top rope and hit the floor in order to be eliminated. If a wrestler falls to the floor without going over the top rope or is thrown over the top but does not fall to the floor, the competitor may re-enter the ring and continue the match.

The final portion of the match consists of the last two competitors squaring off in a regular singles match in which victory must be attained by pinfall or submission. 

The Gauntlet for the Gold usually involves a double digit number of wrestlers, and the prize is usually either a championship or a championship match opportunity.

Variations 
There is a tag team variation of the Gauntlet for the Gold. A single wrestler enters one at a time at predetermined intervals. When all but two competitors are eliminated, the partners of the two survivors return and the match becomes a standard tag team match.

On October 23, 2005, at the Bound for Glory pay-per-view, the Gauntlet for the Gold Match was fought as completely elimination-only, since the winner had to immediately face the NWA World Heavyweight Champion for the title.

There was also an Ultimate X Gauntlet at Victory Road in 2007, with over-the-top-rope rules and after all 10 participants entered the match, it became a standard Ultimate X match, with the remaining entrants in the match competing in it.

Call Your Shot
In 2019, Impact Wrestling introduced a modified version of the match, called the Call Your Shot Gauntlet. While continuing to use the same rules and format as before, the Call Your Shot version is open to both men and women. The Call Your Shot winner receives a trophy, and earns a future championship match (for the title, and at the time, of their choosing) with the stipulation of having one year to invoke their championship match privilege (which is done by handing in the trophy to an official - similar to WWE's Money in the Bank briefcase).

Since then, the Call Your Shot Gauntlet has become an annual tradition at Bound for Glory, which is Impact's biggest show of the year.

Match history

Gauntlet for the Gold / Bound for Gold

Call Your Shot Gauntlet

Records

Most Gauntlet for the Gold victories

Most times being a Gauntlet for the Gold runner-up

References 

Impact Wrestling
Impact Wrestling match types
Professional wrestling battle royales